Scott Yaphe (born February 16, 1970) is a Canadian actor and comedian best known as a cast member of the YTV variety show It's Alive!. After its cancellation in 1997, Yaphe and a few other It's Alive! regulars such as Mike Beaver and Patricia Ribeiro, moved over to the game show Uh Oh!, where he became the host by his fictional name, "Wink Yahoo". Yaphe appeared in the movie Amelia in the third quarter of 2009, as well as in the recurring roles of Sliver in the second season of Disney XD's, Aaron Stone and as Zafer Griffin in the Cartoon Network live-action series, Unnatural History.  He also appeared in Global's police drama Rookie Blue, which began in 2010.

Yaphe has appeared in numerous TV commercials such as the Whiskas Temptations cat treats spot and the fast talker for expedia.ca. A prominent voice actor as well, he is the promo-voice for the Canadian television station, Sun TV, as well as the voice behind many radio and television commercials, cartoons and the radio comedy series Grip Radio, produced by Lategan Media Group.

Personal life
Yaphe was born in Montreal, Quebec. He is married to comedian and actress Jessica Holmes and has two children, Alexa Lola and Jordan Harrison.

External links

Official web site

1970 births
Anglophone Quebec people
Living people
Comedians from Montreal
Male actors from Montreal
Canadian male comedians
Canadian male voice actors
Canadian male television actors
Canadian male film actors
Canadian male radio actors
Canadian game show hosts